Tyrone Ellis (born July 31, 1946) is an American pastor and politician. He is a member of the Mississippi House of Representatives from the 38th District, being first elected in 1979. He is a member of the Democratic party.

In June 2017, Ellis announced his retirement from politics. He said he would continue serving as a pastor at the Running Water Baptist Church in Noxubee County, Mississippi.

References

1946 births
Living people
Democratic Party members of the Mississippi House of Representatives
People from Starkville, Mississippi
21st-century American politicians
African-American state legislators in Mississippi
21st-century African-American politicians
20th-century African-American people